Pecco  is a village in the Metropolitan City of Turin in the Italian region Piedmont.

Pecco  may also refer to:

 Renzo Pecco, an Italian surgeon and professor
 Orange pecco, a tea

See also

 Pekko
 Peco (disambiguation)